Capraita scalaris is a species of flea beetle in the family Chrysomelidae. It is found in North America.

References

Further reading

External links

 

Alticini
Articles created by Qbugbot
Beetles described in 1847
Taxa named by Frederick Ernst Melsheimer